This was the first edition of the tournament.

Vesna Dolonc won the title, defeating Maria João Koehler in the final, 6–2, 6–3.

Seeds

Draw

Finals

Top half

Bottom half

References 
Main Draw
Qualifying Draw

Viccourt Cup - Singles
Viccourt Cup
2012 in Ukrainian sport